Torregamones is a municipality located in the province of Zamora, Castile and León, Spain. According to the 2007 census (INE), the municipality has a population of 310 inhabitants (166 men and 144 women). It plays a relative importance in the comarca of Sayago, as a link between Portugal (the town of Miranda do Douro) and this zone of the province of Zamora. Apart from Portugal, Torregamones abuts with Villardiegua de la Ribera to the north, Moralina to the east and also Gamones to the south.

References

Municipalities of the Province of Zamora